Charles Bernhard Garfinkel (December 25, 1890 – September 1969) was an American politician from New York.

Life
He was born on December 25, 1890, in Derazhnia, Russian Empire, the youngest of eight children of a lawyer who died a year after Charles's birth. His mother emigrated with the children to the United States in 1897. He became a salesman of print paper, and lived in the Bronx.

Garfinkel was a member of the Socialist Party of America. In November 1917, he was elected to the New York State Assembly (Bronx Co., 5th D.), defeating the incumbent Democrat William S. Evans. Garfinkel was one of ten Socialist members of the 141st New York State Legislature in 1918. He introduced one of the earliest rent control bills, but it did not pass the committee stage. The Citizens Union said that Garfinkel was "very attentive and made an excellent record of votes on city bills". In November 1918, he ran for re-election, but was defeated by his Democratic predecessor Evans who had been endorsed by the Republicans.

In 1934, he ran for Congress in the 22nd District, but was defeated by the incumbent Democrat Anthony J. Griffin.

In December 1935, after the expulsion of the Old Guard faction, Garfinkel was elected by the New York City Central Committee of the Socialist Party as Temporary Chairman.

In November 1936, he ran for the New York State Senate (23rd D.) but was defeated by the incumbent Democrat John J. Dunnigan.

He died in September 1969.

References

1890 births
1969 deaths
Members of the New York State Assembly
Socialist Party of America politicians from New York (state)
Emigrants from the Russian Empire to the United States
People from Khmelnytskyi Oblast
20th-century American politicians
Politicians from the Bronx